Emilio Fede (born 24 June 1931) is an Italian anchorman, journalist and writer. He has been the director of TG1 (from 1981 to 1982), a news programme on Raiuno, Studio Aperto (from 1991 to 1992), a news programme on Italia 1, and TG4 (from 1992 to 2012), a news programme on Rete 4.

Biography
Fede was born in Barcellona Pozzo di Gotto, Sicily. He spent part of his youth living in nearby San Piero Patti.
 
He started his career in the Italian public broadcasting company (RAI) in the early 1950s, and went on to become one of the most popular faces in its news dominant TV market share in Italy. Fede during the direction  since 1991 to 2012 of TG4, a news programme on Rete 4, owned by Italian tycoon and former premier Silvio Berlusconi, has been often accused of excessive partisanship for Berlusconi in his news management.

Fede is, at present, indicted for favouring prostitution of a minor in the framework of the so-called Rubygate scandal.

Assault
On 24 November 2010, Fede was assaulted at a restaurant in Milan's city centre by Gian Germano Giuliani, the owner of Giuliani Pharmaceuticals.

Prison 
In 2017, Fede was sentenced to jail for three years, six months because of bankruptcy.  He was found guilty of pocketing 1.1 million euros that were supposed to be used to prevent Lele Mora's agency from going bankrupt.  The court ordered him to pay back the money immediately.

Books
Finché c'è Fede (1997)
Privé. La vita è un gioco (1998)
L'invidiato speciale (1999)
La foglia di fico (2000)
Samba dei ruffiani (2001)
La cena dei cretini (2002)
Ladro d'amore (2003)
Peluche (2005)
Fuori Onda (2006)

All published by Arnoldo Mondadori Editore.

References

1931 births
Living people
People from Barcellona Pozzo di Gotto
Italian television journalists
Mass media people from Sicily
People from San Piero Patti